Hyltebruks IF is a Swedish football club located in Hyltebruk.

Background
Hyltebruks IF currently plays in Division 4 Halland Elit which is the sixth tier of  Swedish football. They play their home matches at Örnvallen in Hyltebruk. In the 1930s, the club also played bandy. The club is affiliated to Hallands Fotbollförbund.

Footnotes

External links
Hyltebruks IF – Official website

Football clubs in Halland County
Association football clubs established in 1922
Bandy clubs established in 1922
Defunct bandy clubs in Sweden